Timeless 2013 is the sixth live album by French singer-songwriter Mylène Farmer. It was released on 9 December 2013 in France by Polydor Records. The album documents the Timeless tour's performances at the Halle Tony Garnier in Lyon, France. A concert film directed by François Hanss was screened in more than one hundred cinemas across France, Belgium and Switzerland on 27 March 2014. The film was released on DVD and Blu-Ray on 16 May 2014. The album does not contain "Elle a dit", "Je te dis tout" and "Et pourtant...".

Background 
Three days before the launch of the Timeless Tour, Francois Hanss confirmed on Twitter that the shows in Lyon, France will be filmed for a future concert film. Rumors began to surface about a possible release date for a live album. French record stores received pre-order forms for the album, thus confirming the release date of the album for 9 December 2013. On 30 October 2013, Polydor Records officially announced the title and track listing for Timeless 2013.

Promotion 
To promote the album, Polydor launched a micro site for the album. Five teaser videos are scheduled to be released at 6 pm on 25 November 29 November, 2 December 4 and 6 December. A 20-second television spot has been released on 27 November 2013. On 2 December 2013, Polydor announced that "Diabolique mon ange" will be the first single from the live album. It was released to radio stations on 4 December 2013.

"Timeless 2013" had record-breaking sales for a live album in France. It debuted at No. 2. During its first week of release, the album has sold over 70,000 copies in one week (much more than her two previous live albums, even though they had charted at No. 1) ; the other two biggest-selling live albums of the year in France, Johnny Hallyday and Muse, had sold around 30,000 copies each during their first week, making Farmer's live album a record-breaking commercial hit.

Track listing

Album charts

Weekly album charts

Year-end album charts

DVD charts

Weekly DVD charts

Year-end DVD charts

Certifications and sales

!colspan=3|Album
|-

!colspan=3|DVD
|-

References

Mylène Farmer albums